Gonda district is one of the districts of Uttar Pradesh, India. The city of Gonda is the district headquarters, and also the administrative centre for the Devipatan Division.

History 
Under the Nawabs of Awadh, Gonda was originally part of the Nizamat of Gorakhpur, but after Gorakhpur was ceded to the British in 1801, Gonda was united with Bahraich district. It was created as a separate district by the British when they annexed Awadh in 1856. In 1875, parts of Gonda district between Baghaura Tal and the Arrah river were ceded to Nepal by the British government.

The territory covered by the present district of Gonda formed part of the ancient Kosala Kingdom. After the going of Lord Rama, the celebrated ruler of the Solar Dynasty who ruled Kosala, the kingdom was divided into two portions defined by the Ghaghara river. The northern portion was then ruled by his son, Lava with the city of Sravasti as his capital.

More recently, ancient Buddhist remains dating to the early days of Buddhism have been found throughout the region, including at Sravasti.

Gonda played a significant part in the Indian struggle for independence, with many people from the region actively involved: including Raja Devi Baksh Singh, who escaped to Nepal, freedom fighters like Chandra Shekhar Azad took shelter in the district, and Rajendra Lahiri was incarcerated and hanged in the Gonda Jail.

In more recent times, the district received media attention throughout India due to the protracted court case surrounding the murder of 13 people known as the 1982 Gonda Encounter.

Industry 
There are several sugar mills, rice mills and many other small industries and handicraft industry. One of the India's six Indian Telephone Industries is situated at Mankapur, and the largest sugar mill in India is situated at Kundarkhi.

In 2006 the Ministry of Panchayati Raj named Gonda one of the country's 250 most backward districts (out of a total of 640). It is one of the 34 districts in Uttar Pradesh currently receiving funds from the Backward Regions Grant Fund Programme (BRGF).

Demographics

Population 

According to the 2011 census Gonda district has a population of 3,433,919, roughly equal to the nation of Panama or the US state of Connecticut. This gives it a ranking of 95th in India (out of a total of 640). The total number of literates in the district is 1,679,99 which constitute 48.9% of the total population. Population in the age range of 0 to 6 years was 572,386. The effective literacy (population 7 years and above) was 58.7%. Its population growth rate over the decade 2001-2011 was 24.17%, higher than the average of Uttar Pradesh (20.09%). Gonda has a sex ratio of 921 females for every 1000 males, and a sex ratio among children 0–6 years old of 926, both higher than the state average (908 and 899 respectively). Scheduled Castes made up 15.49% of the population.

The human development index of the Gonda district is very low.

Tehsils (Sub-district) 
There are four Tehsils in Gonda district.

 Colonelganj
 Gonda
 Mankapur
 Tarabganj

Blocks 
Gonda district comprises 16 Blocks:

 Babhanjot
 Belsar
 Chhapia
 Colonelganj
 Haldharmau
 Itiathok
 Jhanjhari
 Katra Bazar
 Mankapur
 Mujehana
 Nawabganj
 Pandri Kripal
 Paraspur
 Rupaidih
 Tarabganj
 Wazirganj

Religion 

Gonda district is Hindu-majority, but with a significant Muslim minority.

Languages 

The official language of the district is Hindi and additional official language is Urdu. At the time of the 2011 Census of India, 81.03% of the population in the district spoke Hindi, 16.04% Awadhi and 2.68% Urdu as their first language.

Languages spoken in the district include Awadhi, a tongue of the Hindi continuum spoken by over 38 million people, mainly in the Awadh region; and Hindi.

Education 
The effective literacy rate (7+) is 58.71%, the state average (69.72%). The government of India has created a special scheme for underdeveloped districts through the "Backward Region Grant Fund". Gonda is one of the recipients of this fund.

Public health 
Gonda has 15 hospitals, 27 Ayurvedic hospitals, 11 Homeopathic hospitals and 2 Unani hospitals, in addition to 66 Government Primary Health Centres.
Gonda is one of the districts in the list of top 100 districts in order of Infant Mortality Rate in 2011 census data. It also comes in the top 57 districts with the highest maternal mortality rate

Gonda has been listed as cleanest Nagar Palika in entire Uttar Pradesh according to the Swachhta Sarvekshan 2022 overturning its last position in the country as per the 2017 survey.

Notable people 

 Adam Gondvi
 Avadh Ojha Sir
 Vinod Singh (Gonda politician)
 Bawan Singh
 Ketki Devi Singh
 Fasi-ur-Rehman Munnan Khan
 Mahboob Meena Shah
 Raja Devi Bakhsh Singh

References

External links 
 
 Alternative Web Site Of the Gonda District
 Gonda District at The Imperial Gazetteer of India, 1908, v. 12, p. 311-319.

 
Districts of Uttar Pradesh